Paratalanta ussurialis is a moth in the family Crambidae. It was described by Otto Vasilievich Bremer in 1864. It is found in the Russian Far East, Iran, Taiwan and Japan.

Subspecies
Paratalanta ussurialis ussurialis
Paratalanta ussurialis taiwanensis Yamanaka, 1972 (Taiwan)

References

Moths described in 1864
Pyraustinae